The Battle of Fort Mose (often called Bloody Mose, or Bloody Moosa) was a significant action of the War of Jenkins' Ear that took place on June 14, 1740 in Spanish Florida. Captain Antonio Salgado commanded a Spanish column of 300 regular troops, backed by the free black militia under Francisco Menéndez and allied Seminole warriors consisting of Indian auxiliaries. They stormed Fort Mose, a strategically crucial position newly held by 170 British soldiers under Colonel John Palmer. Palmer and his garrison had taken the fort from the Spanish as part of James Oglethorpe's offensive to capture St. Augustine. 

Taken by surprise, the British garrison was virtually annihilated. Colonel Palmer, three captains and three lieutenants were among the British troops killed in action. The battle destroyed the fort. The Spanish did not rebuild it until 1752.

Background
Located two miles north of St. Augustine, Fort Mose was established in 1738 by the Spanish as a refuge for fugitive slaves escaping from the colonies of Georgia and South Carolina. Forty-five years earlier, in 1693, King Charles II had ordered his Florida colonists to give all runaway slaves from the Virginia Colony freedom and protection if they converted to Catholicism and agreed to serve Spain.

The fort consisted of a church, a wall of timber with some towers, and some twenty houses inhabited by a hundred people. The maroons were commissioned as Spanish militia by Governor Manuel de Montiano and put under the command of Captain Francisco Menéndez, a mulatto or creole of African-Spanish descent, who had escaped from slavery in the colony South Carolina.

The fort, to the Spanish, served as both a colony of freedmen and as Spanish Florida's front-line of defense against possible incursions from the Southern colonies. Word of the free black settlement reached the Province of South Carolina; it is believed to have helped inspire the Stono Rebellion in September 1739. During the slave revolt, several dozen blacks headed for Spanish Florida, and were recruited into the colonial militia. 

At the outbreak of the War of Jenkins’ Ear in 1739, General James Oglethorpe, governor of Georgia, encouraged by some successful raids made by the British and their Indian allies in the frontier, decided to raise a significant expedition to capture St. Augustine, capital of Spanish Florida. As part of the campaign, he realized his forces had to capture and hold Fort Mose.

Oglethorpe launched his campaign. Regular troops from South Carolina and Georgia, militia volunteers, about 600 allied Indian Creek and Uchise allies, and about 800 blacks as auxiliaries made up the expedition, which was supported at sea by seven ships of the Royal Navy. Montiano, who had 600 regulars including reinforcements recently arrived from Cuba, began to entrench his position. On several occasions he attempted to unsuccessfully attack the British lines by taking them by surprise.

Battle
Approaching St. Augustine, a British party under Colonel John Palmer, composed of 170 men belonging to the Georgia colonial militia, the Highland Independent Company of Darien, and auxiliary native allies, rapidly occupied Fort Mose, strategically sited on a vital travel route. The British forces suffered from conflicts in command and control. The Highlanders were primarily Gaelic speaking and were unimpressed with Colonel Palmer's leadership. For his part, Colonel Palmer was likewise distrustful of the Highlanders' abilities as disciplined soldiers.

Manuel de Montiano had ordered the fort abandoned after some of its inhabitants had been killed by Indian allies of the British. The free black residents moved to St. Augustine.

While the Oglethorpe expedition laid siege to St. Augustine, Montiano considered his options. Knowing the strategic importance of Fort Mose, and realizing its vulnerabilities, Montiano decided to undertake a counter-offensive operation. At dawn on June 14, Captain Antonio Salgado commanded Spanish regulars, and Francisco Menéndez led the maroon militia and Seminole Indian auxiliaries, in a surprise attack on Mose. The attack was initiated two hours before the British soldiers awoke so that they could not prepare their arms for defense. About 75 of the British troops were killed and 34 were captured in bloody hand-to-hand combat with swords, muskets, and clubs.

Aftermath
The Spanish victory at Fort Mose demoralized the badly divided British forces and was a significant factor in Oglethorpe's withdrawal to Savannah. In late June St. Augustine was relieved by Spanish forces from Havana, and the Royal Navy's warships abandoned the land forces. Governor Montiano commended the maroons for their bravery. Although Fort Mose had been destroyed during the siege, its former residents were resettled in St. Augustine for the next decade as free and equal Spanish colonial citizens.

When the Spanish rebuilt the fort in 1752, free blacks returned there. After the British victory against the French in the Seven Years' War, it took over East Florida in a related trade with Spain. Most of the residents and military evacuated to Cuba, and Francisco Menéndez and most of the free blacks went with them.

See also

Battle of Bloody Marsh
Invasion of Georgia (1742)
Francisco Menéndez

Notes

References

Burnett, Gene M. (1997). Florida's Past: People and Events That Shaped the State. Pineapple Press Inc. 
De Quesada, A. M. (2006). A History of Florida Forts: Florida's Lonely Outposts. The History Press. 
Gómez, Santiago: La Guerra de la Oreja de Jenkins. Combates en el Caribe. Operaciones principales. Revista de Historia Naval 
Henderson, Ann L. (1991). Spanish Pathways in Florida, 1492–1992. Pineapple Press Inc. 
Jones, Maxine D.; McCarthy, Kevin M. (1993). African Americans in Florida. Pineapple Press Inc. 
Landers, Jane (1999). Black Society in Spanish Florida. University of Illinois Press. 

Marley, David (1998). Wars of the Americas: a Chronology of Armed Conflict in the New World, 1492 to the Present. ABC-CLIO. 
Martínez Laínez, Fernando; Canales, Carlos (2009). Banderas Lejanas: la Exploración, Conquista y Defensa por España del Territorio de los Actuales Estados Unidos. EDAF. 
Riordan, Patrick. "Finding Freedom in Florida: Native Peoples, African Americans, and Colonists, 1670–1816", Florida Historical Quarterly 75(1), 1996, pp. 25–44, at JSTOR. 
Twyman, Bruce Edward. The Black Seminole Legacy and Northern American Politics, 1693–1845. Washington: Howard University Press, 1999.
Wasserman, Adam (2009). A People's History of Florida 1513–1876: How Africans, Seminoles, Women, and Lower Class Whites Shaped the Sunshine State. Adam Wasserman. 

Battles in Florida
Battles of the War of Jenkins' Ear
Conflicts in 1740
Sieges involving Great Britain
Sieges involving Spain
Spanish Florida
African-American history of Florida
1740 in North America